Stevan Milovac (Serbian Cyrillic: Стеван Миловац; born 25 February 1962) is a Serbian retired footballer who played as a defensive midfielder.

Football career
Milovac was born in Novi Sad, Socialist Federal Republic of Yugoslavia. In his country he represented FK Novi Sad (second division) and FK Vojvodina, helping the latter win the Yugoslav First League in the 1988–89 season.

In January 1990, aged 28, Milovac was allowed to leave the country and signed for S.C. Salgueiros in Portugal, helping to promotion to the Primeira Liga in his first season. In the following campaign the Paranhos side overachieved for a final fifth place, with the subsequent qualification to the UEFA Cup – a first-ever– with the player scoring three goals in 36 games; in five of his seven-and-a-half years with the club, he shared teams with countrymen Čedomir Đoinčević and Jovica Nikolić.

After 1996–97, with Salgueiros nearly qualifying for Europe after finishing in sixth position, 35-year-old Milovac retired from football, having appeared in nearly 250 official matches for Salgueiros.

Personal life
Milovac married Andja, with the couple having one son, Stefan. After ending his football career he settled in Portugal, owning and running a restaurant in Faro.

References

External links

1962 births
Living people
Footballers from Novi Sad
Yugoslav footballers
Serbian footballers
Association football midfielders
Yugoslav First League players
RFK Novi Sad 1921 players
FK Vojvodina players
Primeira Liga players
Liga Portugal 2 players
S.C. Salgueiros players
Serbian expatriate footballers
Expatriate footballers in Portugal
Serbian expatriate sportspeople in Portugal